Malattaru is branched from Ponnaiyar River and ends in Bay of Bengal.

Rivers of Tamil Nadu
Rivers of India